The High Point, Thomasville, and Denton Railroad (Reporting mark HPTD) was a 20-mile short-line railroad owned by the jointly CSX Transportation and Norfolk Southern Railway owned Winston-Salem Southbound Railway (WSS). The Winston-Salem Southbound Railway, filed a request April 13, 2010, to merge the High Point, Thomasville, and Denton Railroad into the Winston-Salem Southbound Railway.  The Surface Transportation Board published notice of this transaction April 16, 2010 to be effective May 1.

Norfolk Southern has a small yard in High Point at the beginning of the line.

Traffic
Commodities carried by the line are grain, sand, gravel, stone, forest products, paper products, coal, coke, cement, clay, fertilizer, aluminum, chemicals, iron, and steel.

Motive power
At the present time, locomotives are provided by CSX or Norfolk Southern.

See also

CSX Transportation
Norfolk Southern Railway
Winston-Salem Southbound Railway

References

External links
 Timeline and map
 Past locomotives
 Railway Association of North Carolina

North Carolina railroads